The Fo Guang Shan Buddha Museum, formerly known as the Buddha Memorial Center, is a Mahāyāna Buddhist cultural, religious, and educational museum located in Dashu District, Kaohsiung, Taiwan. The museum is affiliated with Fo Guang Shan, one of Taiwan's largest Buddhist organizations. The museum is located next to the Fo Guang Shan Monastery, the headquarters of the order. The museum houses one of the tooth relics of Sakyamuni Buddha, the founder of the Buddhist faith. The museum was accepted as the youngest member of the International Council of Museums (ICOM) in 2014.

Since 2015, the museum has been certified ISO 50001 2011 by the Quality management system.

History
In 1998, Venerable Master Hsing Yun travelled to Bodh Gaya, India to confer the precepts for full ordination. He was entrusted with a tooth relic by Kunga Dorje Rinpoche who had safeguarded the relic for nearly 30 years. Rinpoche was touched by the efforts of Fo Guang Shan in promoting exchanges between different Buddhist traditions, and he hoped that the relic could be enshrined in Taiwan as a symbol of Dharma preservation. Speaking about the need to build the shrine, the Venerable Master said “The Buddha does not need anybody’s worship or reverence; it is living beings that need inspiration to develop wholesome thoughts and purify their minds. By worshipping a memorial, people can come to know the Buddha’s Dharma body, and their feelings of admiration can be elevated into wanting to learn about the Buddha’s virtues and practice them in everyday life. The Buddha doesn’t need a memorial, but living beings do. I built this pagoda with this in mind.”

The museum's construction started in 2008, and was officially opened to the public in December 2011. More than 100 alterations were made to the museum's actual design. Just before the foundation was finished, Venerable Master Hsing Yun was moved to put out a basic plan for the future Buddha Museum using a few mineral water bottles, a tissue box, and some newspapers.

Missions of the Buddha Museum
48 Underground Palaces - to preserve human civilization and record human history
Buddhist Art - to promote Buddhist arts through exhibitions and academic conferences
Inter-Museum Exchanges - to gain mutual support and encourage new ideas through inter-museum interactions
Life Education - to promote cultural arts and environmental protection
Public Services

Objectives of the Buddha Museum
To present Buddhism through arts and culture
To present Buddhism through motion pictures and movies 
To present Buddhism through humanistic dimensions
To present Buddhism through international dynamics

Core Values

Three Acts of Goodness
Do Good Deeds
Speak Good Words
Think Good Thoughts

Four Givings
Giving Other Confidence
Giving Others Joy
Giving Others Hope
Giving Others Convenience

Architecture

Front Hall

The Front Hall is flanked by the Gate of Perfect Ease and the Gate of Liberation. The lion and elephant, both accompanied by smaller cubs, welcome guests from either side of the doors. The elephant on the right, measuring five-meters tall and six meters long, symbolizes the conception of Prince Siddhartha who entered the womb of his mother on a white elephant. The lion on the left has the same measurements and represents the roar of the Buddha's teachings. Inside, visitors may borrow wheelchairs and baby-strollers from the Information Desk. There are also restaurants and a buffet.

Included inside is a semi-permanent shop dedicated to Wu Ching, a sculptor who became famous for his work with gold and who was one of the first exhibits at the museum. Liuli Gongfang also has a shop/gallery opposite one of the restaurants featuring work by the artist Loretta Yang, whose Thousand-Armed, Thousand-Eyes Avalokiteśvara statue is a permanent fixture in the Avalokiteśvara Shrine.

Eight Pagodas

There are eight pagodas, each representing different ideas or precepts.

One Teaching Pagoda
One teaching refers to Humanistic Buddhism, which represents Buddhist teachings that advocate ways to a happier life. The One Teaching Pagoda serves as a multi-functional space for holding meetings, activities, and training courses. It is available to the public for rent.

Two Assemblies Pagoda

The two assemblies refer to both the monastic and lay assemblies. The pagoda was designed with children in mind. Through interactive 3D videos, children learn to practice the Three Acts of Goodness. The multimedia theater is designed with sensory screens to allow interaction with the audience. Visitors can also experience releasing sky lanterns in a virtual way.

The pagoda serves as a Children's Gallery and is designed with interactive games which children can interact with. A 3D theatre allows them to learn how to practice doing good deeds, saying good words, and having good thoughts.

Three Goodness Pagoda
The Three Goodness refers to the wholesome deeds of the body, speech, and mind. The pagoda is a joint office consisting of a meeting room and two guest halls.

Four Givings Pagoda
The four givings refer to Giving Others Confidence, Giving Others Joy, Giving Others Hope, and Giving Others Convenience. This Pagoda serves as a bookstore where visitors can read and relax. Every Saturday and Sunday, there are story-telling sessions from 10 am to 4:30 pm at the children corner. Multimedia including chanting, children singing, and orchestral music, are also available at the bookstore.

Five Harmonies Pagoda
The five harmonies refer to “personal harmony achieved through joy, interpersonal harmony achieved through respect, family harmony achieved through deference, social harmony achieved through cooperation, and world harmony achieved through peace.” The pagoda serves to celebrate family events in different ways, including Buddhist weddings, baby blessing ceremonies, and birthday celebrations. Families can also take photographs to keep as albums for remembering those joyous occasions.

Six Perfections Pagoda
The pagoda is named after the Six Perfections, namely giving, ethics, patience, diligence, meditation, and wisdom. The pagoda is fitted with a long-term exhibition displaying information on Venerable Master Hsing Yun Public Education Trust Fund and the works of Venerable Master's One-Stroke Calligraphy. Through a 3D video presentation, viewers get to watch how Venerable Master penned his calligraphy works in one stroke using his inner eye.

Seven Admonishment Pagoda
The seven admonishments refer to admonishing drugs, pornography, violence, stealing, gambling, alcohol, and harsh words. Through these seven admonishments, all individuals, families, and even the society would be influenced by a positive mindset. When everyone thinks positively, the society would become a blissful pure land. The Seven Admonishment Pagoda serves as a resting place where visitors can have a cup of tea and relax.

Eightfold Path Pagoda
The Eightfold Path includes the eight elements that leads a person to liberation: right view, right understanding, right speech, right action, right livelihood, right effort, right mindfulness, and right concentration. The Eightfold Path Pagoda serves a resting place where visitors can watch introductory videos.

Twin Pavilions

A gold-colored structure surrounded by a pond filled with lotuses. The 1st floor is the Tea House that serves Taiwanese cuisine in vegetarian form. Visitors can sample Tea Chan and Sutra Calligraphy on the 2nd and 3rd floors, respectively. Keynote lectures are also conducted on the 3rd floor. These lectures are open to public and discuss issues on education, culture and the arts.

Bodhi Wisdom Concourse

Eighteen Arhats

These statues are lined along the sides of the court and were designed by the Taiwanese sculptor Wu Jung-Tzu. They feature the Ten Great Disciples of the Buddha(Sariputra, Maudgalyayana, Mahakasyapa, Subhuti, Purna, Katyayana, Aniruddha, Upali, Rahula, Ananda), three arhats from the Amitabha Sutra (Cudapanthaka, Pindola, Kalodayin), and two arhats from Chinese folklore (the Dragon-Subduing Arhat and the Tiger-Taming Arhat) In a move to show equality between the sexes, the Venerable Master Hsing Yun also included 3 female bhiksunis: Mahaprajapati, Bhadra Kapilani, Utpalavarna.

Eight Patriarchs
These are located along the front of the Main Hall. They depict the founding patriarchs of the Eight Mahayana Schools of Chinese Buddhism and were designed by the Taiwanese sculptor Wu Jung-Tzu. The eight patriarchs are: 
Jizang of the Three Treatise school
Xianshou of the Huayan school
Xuanzang of the Faxiang school
Zhiyi of the Tiantai school
Bodhidharma of the Chan school
Huiyuan of the Pure Land school
Daoxuan of the Nanshan Vinaya school
Subhakarasimha of the Vajrayana school

Main Hall
 
The Main Hall is a domed-shaped stupa built in the Indian style. The base is made from yellow sandstone while the body is made from rock. The spire in the center is a sutra repository that houses a million copies of the Heart Sutra. The “One Million Heart Sutras in the Buddha” movement was launched with the construction of the Buddha Museum.

Mount Potalaka Avalokiteśvara Shrine

Located at the front of the Main Hall. The shrine houses the Thousand-Armed, Thousand-Eyes Avalokiteśvara statue made by the contemporary glass artist Loretta Yang. The statue measures almost 5 meters tall, and is currently the tallest statue by the artist. Avalokitesvara is flanked by Sudhana and the Naga girl. The semicircular wall behind Avalokitesvara depicts the Great Compassion Mantra while the sides are lined with the 33 manifestations of Avalokitesvara Bodhisattva. The exterior wall of the shrine is decorated with the Universal Gate Chapter of the Lotus Sutra.

Golden Buddha Shrine
This is located directly behind the Avalokiteśvara Shrine and houses a golden statue of the Buddha that was gifted to Fo Guang Shan in 2004 by the Supreme Patriarch of Thailand, Somdet Phra Nyanasamvara, for his 90th birthday.

Jade Buddha Shrine

The shrine is located at the very back of the Main Hall. It houses a Reclining Buddha statue sculpted from Burmese white jade. The statue symbolizes the Buddha's passing into parinirvana. Enshrined in a reliquary above the statue is the Buddha's tooth relic. The adjacent walls flanking the statue are colorful jade reliefs of the Western Sukhavati Pure Land of Amitabha Buddha and the Eastern Vaidurya Pure Land of the Medicine Buddha. The side walls are of sandalwood reliefs of stupas and pagodas sculpted in a variety of forms and shapes.

Museum of Underground Palaces

This gallery exhibits artifacts from various Underground Palaces but predominantly from the one discovered beneath Famen Temple.

Museum of Buddhist Festivals

The gallery explains various Buddhist festivals that are celebrated at Fo Guang Shan with interactive technology. These festivals include:
Bathing the Baby Buddha on Buddha's Birthday
Taking 3 Steps 1 Bow Ceremony on Avalokitesvara's Birthday
Observing Ullambana during the seventh lunar month
Offering food to the Sangha on Sangha Day

Historical Museum of Fo Guang Shan
This gallery shows in great detail the complete history of Fo Guang Shan up to 2011.

Museum of the Life of the Buddha
Tells the story of Sakyamuni Buddha from his birth to his parinirvana. The gallery also plays two 4D short films during the day for free. 
Morning show: Life of the Buddha
Afternoon show: The Poor Girl's Lamp

Great Enlightenment Auditorium
This facility is located on the 3rd floor. The multi-functional auditorium can accommodate 2,000 people. In the center, there is a 360-degree screen. The round stage in the center of the floor can be rotated so audiences can view the performances from different directions. Since its opening, many international troupes have performed at this auditorium.

Four Noble Truths Stupas
The Four Noble Truths Stupas, erected at the four corners of the Main Hall, are testaments to the first teaching that the Buddha gave following his enlightenment. The Four Noble Truths Stupas correspond to the Four Great Bodhisattvas: Avalokitesvara, Ksitigarbha, Manjusri, and Samantabhadra. Offerings of incense, flowers, and light can be made to the Bodhisattvas at these stupas.

Fo Guang Big Buddha
 
In 2011, the Fo Guang Big Buddha was completed after more than a year of casting, utilizing almost 1,800 ton of metal. The statue itself measures 40 meters high, the seat is 10 meters high. Altogether, the total height is 108 meters (an auspicious number in Buddhism). The statue depicts Sakyamuni Buddha.

Underground Palaces
Though not open to the public, the Buddha Museum has 48 underground palaces that serve as time capsules. Its contents are artifacts that are either historic, contemporary, or commemorative in nature. The museum plans to open one of these underground palaces every hundred years and to place other items inside before sealing it again. A permanent exhibition about the underground palaces can be found on the first floor of the Main Hall.

Art

Reliefs

These can be found along the covered walkways and within the Main Hall. 
There are 22 semi-reliefs of the Buddha's acts of compassion and wisdom collectively known as the Stories of the Buddha. 
The Chan Art and Stories are sampled from Chan Heart, Chan Art by Gao Er-tai and his wife Pu Xiaoyu. 
The Life Protection Murals were sculpted based on the Protecting Lives Series painted by Feng Zikai and his daughter, Feng Yiyin. 
Reliefs in jade illustrating the Western Pure Land of Amitabha Buddha and the Eastern Pure Land of the Medicine Buddha can be found in the Jade Buddha Shrine. 
Wooden reliefs depicting different styles of stupas from around the world can be found on the side walls of the Jade Buddha Shrine.

One-Stroke Calligraphy
Venerable Master Hsing Yun's One-Stroke Calligraphy can be seen throughout the museum on the walls and signs of each building. A more permanent exhibition is located in the Six Perfections Pagoda.

Statues
These are located toward the back of the museum.
The Eighteen Arhats and Eight Patriarchs were designed by Wu Jung-Tzu and can be found at the Bodhi Wisdom Concourse. 
The Thousand-Armed, Thousand-Eyes Avalokiteśvara statue within the Avalokitesvara Shrine is made by the contemporary glass artist Loretta Yang
The Golden Buddha statue inside the Golden Buddha Shrine was gifted to Fo Guang Shan from the 19th Supreme Patriarch of Thailand in 2004. For his 90th birthday, Somdet Phra Nyanasamvara had 19 statues made and gifted them to countries where Buddhism flourished. Fo Guang Shan was hand-picked to represent Taiwan.
The Reclining Buddha statue inside the Jade Buddha Shrine was sculpted from white jade from Burma.
The Fo Guang Big Buddha located at the very back is made from 1,800 tons of metal and measures 40 meters tall.

Sculpture
A camphor wooden carving depicting Sakyamuni Buddha teaching the Dharma at Vulture Peak to Five Hundred Arhats is visible in the lobby of the Main Hall.

Art Galleries
These are located on the 1st floor and 2nd floor of the Main Hall. There are 4 permanent exhibitions on the 1st floor. The galleries on the 2nd floor are non-permanent and are frequently changed to exhibit art from around the world.

Education
Under Fo Guang Shan's objective to "foster talent through education" the museum has an educational curriculum which hosts educational courses that follow the Three Acts of Goodness - doing good deeds, speaking good words, thinking good thoughts.

Opening Hours
The entrance is free for everyone.
Weekdays: 9:00 ~ 19:00 (Main Hall: 9:00 ~ 18:00)
Weekends: 9:00 ~ 20:00 (Main Hall: 9:00 ~ 19:00)
The museum is closed every Tuesday except for special dates. The official website has more information on these special dates.
Chinese New Year (subject to change, please consult the English website)

See also 

 IBPS Manila
 Zu Lai Temple
 Chung Tian Temple
 Hsi Lai Temple
 Nan Hua Temple
 Please see details on other locations from the bottom link chart : Fo Guang Shan

Awards
2012 - Winner of the Golden Lion Award for Culture and Education in the 13th National Architecture Golden Award.
2013 - Listed in “Top Hundred Religious Spots in Taiwan” by the Ministry of the Interior.
2014 - Certified as the youngest member of International Council of Museums (ICOM).
2014 - Winner of TripAdvisor 2014's Traveler's Choice Award and ranked top as the most popular tourist spot in Kaohsiung
2014 Oct 25 - Received the Excellent Lavatory Award by the Kaohsiung government.
2014 Nov 13 - Became the first religious organization and museum to receive the ISO 50001 energy management certification.
2014 Dec 16 - Bus Lavatory listed as an Excellent Lavatory by the Environmental Protection Administration, and in the digital book The Magic Journey of the Toilet Kingdom.
2015 Oct 31 - Runner-Up for "Public Restroom" Award in Tourist Scenic Site Category of Kaohsiung
2016 Jan 16 - Fifth China Tourism Investment ITIA "Best Historical and Cultural Theme Tourism Project Award"
2016 May - Winner of TripAdvisor 2016 Travelers' Choice Award and ranked fourth in the Top Ten Landmarks of Taiwan
2017 - Certified as a member of American Alliance of Museums (AAM)
2017 - Received 2017 Certificate of Excellence from TripAdvisor
2018 - Received 2018 Certificate of Excellence from TripAdvisor
2019 - Received 2018 Certificate of Excellence from TripAdvisor
2020 - Received 2020 Travelers' Choice Award from TripAdvisor

References

External links

Buddha Museum website
Buddha Museum facebook
Buddha Museum Youtube

2011 establishments in Taiwan
Religious buildings and structures completed in 2011
Museums in Taiwan
Fo Guang Shan
Religious buildings and structures in Kaohsiung
Buddhist museums
Religious organizations established in 2011